Simen Rafn (born 16 February 1992) is a Norwegian professional footballer who plays as a right back for Aalesund.

Career
Rafn was born and grew up in Fredrikstad, Norway, and started playing for the local club Skogstrand IL. As a 15-year-old, he joined Fredrikstad FK's youth academy and was later promoted to the senior team in 2010. He stayed in the club and played 136 league games, before transferring to Gefle as a free agent in November 2015. During the pre-season for 2016 Allsvenskan, Rafn picked up a knee injury and were to miss the whole season. In January 2017 he signed for Lillestrøm.

Career statistics

Honours
Lillestrøm
Norwegian Football Cup: 2017

References

External links

1994 births
Living people
Norwegian footballers
Fredrikstad FK players
Gefle IF players
Lillestrøm SK players
Aalesunds FK players
Norwegian First Division players
Eliteserien players
Norwegian expatriate footballers
Expatriate footballers in Sweden
Norwegian expatriate sportspeople in Sweden
Association football defenders
Sportspeople from Fredrikstad